Patrick Johansson may refer to:

 Patrick Johansson (historian) (born 1946), French-Mexican researcher
 Patrick Johansson (musician) (born 1976), Swedish drummer
 Patrick Johansson (bandy) (born 1963), Swedish bandy player